Hatfield is an unincorporated census-designated place in Luce Township, Spencer County, in the U.S. state of Indiana.  Its population was 813 at the 2010 census.

History
Hatfield was originally called Fair Fight, and under the latter name was laid out in 1883 by James Hatfield. A post office called Hatfield has been in operation since 1886.

Geography

Demographics

References

Census-designated places in Spencer County, Indiana
Census-designated places in Indiana